D. Block Ward is a ward located under Nagaland's capital city, Kohima. The ward falls under the designated Ward No. 6 of the Kohima Municipal Council.

Education
Educational Institutions in D. Block Ward:

Schools 
 Assam Rifles Public School
 D . Block Government Primary School
 East View Home School
 Savio K. G. School

See also
 Municipal Wards of Kohima

References

External links
 Map of Kohima Ward No. 6

Kohima
Wards of Kohima